Pedilus terminalis is a species of fire-colored beetle in the family Pyrochroidae.

References

Further reading

External links

 

Pyrochroidae
Beetles described in 1827